Once Upon a Line is a 2016 animated-short film directed, written and produced by Alicja Jasina. It won the Best Animation Gold Award at Student Academy Awards and was shortlisted with ten other short-film from 69 entries submitted to the 89th Academy Awards in Academy Award for Best Animated Short Film category, but did not make the final cut.

Plot
A man leads a boring life until he falls in love. Things get out of control, but at the end, the protagonist discovers that there are other ways of living and that the world is full of color and hope.

Accolades 
 43rd Annual Student Film Awards - Best Animation Gold Winner.
 Shortlisted for an Academy Award for Best Animated Short Film

See also
2016 in animation
University of Southern California

References

External links
Official website
 
Trailer

American animated short films
2016 animated films
2016 films
2010s American animated films
2016 short films
2010s English-language films